Tiadaghton State Forest is a Pennsylvania State Forest (Forest District #12) in the Pennsylvania Department of Conservation and Natural Resources, Bureau of Forestry. The forest is primarily in western and southern Lycoming County, with small portions in Clinton, Potter, Tioga, and Union Counties. The district's topography consists of narrow, flat to sloping plateaus cut by deep, steep-sloped valleys carved by fast moving mountain streams, including Pine Creek, Slate Run, and their tributaries. The Tiadaghton district extends south across the lowland along the west branch of the Susquehanna River to the narrow crests of Bald Eagle Mountain and North and South White Deer Ridge. The majority of forest cover is dominated by mixed oak forests, with some areas of northern hardwoods. The Tiadaghton State Forest is one of eight forest districts in the Pennsylvania Wilds region.

The forest district office, the Tiadaghton Resource Management Center, is located just north of the town of Waterville, in Lycoming County, Pennsylvania in the United States. Tiadaghton is the Iroquois name for Pine Creek, but its meaning is unknown.

History
As the timber was exhausted and the land burned, many companies simply abandoned their holdings. Conservationists like Dr. Joseph Rothrock became concerned that the forests would not regrow if they were not managed properly. They called for the state to purchase land from the lumber companies and for a change in the philosophy of forest management. In 1895 Rothrock was appointed the first commissioner of the Pennsylvania Department of Forests and Waters, the forerunner of today's Department of Conservation and Natural Resources. In 1897 the Pennsylvania General Assembly passed legislation which authorized the purchase of "unseated lands for forest reservations" and the first Pennsylvania state forest lands were acquired the following year.

On July 13, 1898, the state bought a  tract of land in Cummings Township for $72.99 ($ in  terms). This was the first purchase for what became Tiadaghton State Forest, which surrounds the park. Most of the major purchases for it were made between 1900 and 1935.

2005 Realignment
Prior to the July 1, 2005 realignment of Pennsylvania State Forest Districts, Tiadaghton State Forest included all state forest lands in Lycoming County and encompassed . After realignment, the state forest tracts in eastern Lycoming County became part of the new Loyalsock State Forest. The District #12 office will also move from South Williamsport to Waterville, at the confluence of Little Pine Creek and Pine Creek, where the largest part of the forest is now located. The southern tracts are along Bald Eagle Mountain, North White Deer Ridge, South White Deer Ridge, and the White Deer Hole Creek watershed.

As of 2009, the Tiadaghton State Forest covered , chiefly in Lycoming County with small tracts in Clinton, Potter, Tioga, and Union Counties.

Other attractions

Hiking
Pine Creek Trail;  rail trail from Jersey Shore, Pennsylvania north along Pine Creek to Wellsboro Junction in Tioga county and Tioga State Forest

Natural areas

Algerine Swamp Natural Area; 
Bark Cabin Natural Area; a  stand of old growth Eastern Hemlock, Northern Red Oak, White Ash, Bigtooth Aspen, and Hickories, and the Mid State Trail
Miller Run Natural Area;  oak and hardwood forest, three streams
Red Pine Natural Area;  with a stand of old growth red pine.

Wild Areas
Algerine Wild Area;  with the Black Forest Trail
Wolf Run Wild Area;  with the Golden Eagle Trail

Nearby state parks
Little Pine State Park (Lycoming County)
Ravensburg State Park (Clinton County)
Susquehanna State Park (Lycoming County)
Upper Pine Bottom State Park (Lycoming County)

Neighboring state forest districts
Tioga State Forest (north)
Loyalsock State Forest (east)
Weiser State Forest (southwest)
Bald Eagle State Forest (south)
Sproul State Forest (west)
Susquehannock State Forest (northwest)

References

 Note: As of July 2006, this web page has not been updated to reflect the Pennsylvania State Forest Districts realignment.
 Alt URL 
 Note: Map showing districts after the July 1, 2005 realignment

Pennsylvania state forests
Protected areas of Lycoming County, Pennsylvania
Protected areas of Clinton County, Pennsylvania
Protected areas of Potter County, Pennsylvania
Protected areas of Tioga County, Pennsylvania
Protected areas of Union County, Pennsylvania